
Zaytsev or Zaitsev is a common Russian last name. It stems from the word заяц (zayats, meaning "hare") and is related to the Slovak/Polish surname Zajac and to the Bulgarian/Macedonian surname Zaychev or Zaytchev (Зайчев).    Zaytseva or Zaitseva (За́йцева) are the feminine versions of this surname.

List of persons with the surname

A
Alexander Zaytsev (disambiguation), several people

B
Boris Zaytsev (disambiguation), several people

I
Igor Zaitsev (born 1938), Russian chess grandmaster
Ihor Zaytsev (basketball) (born 1989), Ukrainian basketball player
Ihor Zaytsev (footballer) (1934–2016), Ukrainian Soviet footballer
Ivan Zaytsev (volleyball) (born 1988), Italian volleyball player, son of Vyacheslav Zaytsev

L
Lyudmila Zaytseva (born 1946), Russian actress

M
Mikhail Mitrofanovich Zaytsev (1923–2009), Soviet general and commander of the Group of Soviet Forces in Germany in 1980–1985

N
Nikita Igorevich Zaitsev (born 1991), Russian ice hockey player
Nikolai Zaitsev (born 1989), Russian footballer

O
Olga Alekseyevna Zaitseva (born 1978), Russian biathlete

S
Sergei Zaytsev (born 1969), Russian footballer
Serhiy Zaytsev (born 1974), Ukrainian footballer and football manager
Slava Zaitsev (born 1938), Russian fashion designer

V
Vasily Aleksandrovich Zaitsev (1910–1961), Soviet ace, twice Hero of the Soviet Union
Vasily Grigoryevich Zaitsev (1915–1991), Soviet sniper during World War II and Hero of the Soviet Union
Vyacheslav Zaytsev (born 1952), Soviet volleyball player and Olympic gold medallist

Y
Yevgeni Nikolayevich Zaytsev (born 1971), Russian footballer
Yevgeni Zaytsev (footballer, born 1968), Russian footballer
Yury Konstantinovich Zaitsev (1951–2022), Russian weightlifter and USSR Olympic gold medallist
 (born 1936), Russian physicist

Z
Zamira Zaytseva (born 1953), middle-distance runner from USSR and Uzbekistan

See also
Places
Zaytsev, Bryansk Oblast, a settlement in Bryansk Oblast, Russia
Zaytsev, Republic of Adygea, a former village (khutor) in the Republic of Adygea that existed until 2005 

Russian-language surnames
Surnames from nicknames